Micah Aaron Parsons (born May 26, 1999) is an American football outside linebacker for the Dallas Cowboys of the National Football League (NFL). Parsons played college football at Penn State, where he was named a Consensus All-American, the Butkus–Fitzgerald Linebacker of the Year, and the Cotton Bowl Defensive MVP as a sophomore in 2019, before being drafted by the Cowboys in the first round of the 2021 NFL Draft. Parsons was named the NFL's Defensive Rookie of the Year following the 2021 season.

Early years
Parsons was born in Harrisburg, Pennsylvania on May 26, 1999. He attended Central Dauphin High School for his freshman and sophomore years, before transferring to Harrisburg High School where he started at both defensive end and running back.

As a freshman, he tallied 121 tackles for loss, and 18.5 sacks. As a junior, he collected 69 tackles, 20 tackles for loss, and 13.5 sacks.

As a senior, Parsons posted 1,239 rushing yards, 27 rushing touchdowns (tied for ninth in the state), 99 receiving yards, and 2 receiving touchdowns. He racked up 55 tackles, 17.5 tackles for loss,  sacks and one interception. Parsons also played varsity basketball.

He was a five-star recruit and was ranked #4 in his class by 247Sports.com and #7 by ESPN. Parsons was recruited by Nebraska, Georgia, Oklahoma, Ohio State, Alabama and Penn State. On December 19, it was reported that Ohio State had committed NCAA violations because the university allowed him on the set of ESPN's College GameDay to take a picture with analyst Kirk Herbstreit. Due to the fact that Herbstreit was a former Ohio State University quarterback, it was a violation of NCAA rules as recruits are not allowed to have contact with members of the media associated with former student-athletes. As a result, Ohio State agreed to no longer recruit Parsons.

Penn State University offered Parsons a football scholarship after just four games of his freshman season and he initially committed in the spring of 2016, before decommitting for a while and committing again on December 20, 2017. He graduated Harrisburg High School seven months early to expedite the enrollment process.

College career

After committing to Penn State, Parsons was informed by head coach James Franklin that he would start his Penn State career at middle linebacker rather than defensive end, which he played in high school. Franklin also announced that Parsons would be in contention for the starting job even though he was a true freshman. In his freshman year, Parsons only started one out of 13 games for the Nittany Lions, but managed to lead the team in tackles with 82, while also making 4 tackles for loss, 1.5 sacks, 10 quarterback hurries and 2 forced fumbles. He became the first Nittany Lion to ever lead the team in tackles as a freshman. He started at outside linebacker against Rutgers University, after junior linebacker Cam Brown was disciplined because of a rules violation incident, with Parsons making 7 tackles (2 for loss) and a strip-sack. He had 14 tackles (one for loss) and a strip-sack against the University of Kentucky in the 2019 Citrus Bowl. He finished second in the Big Ten Freshman of the Year voting behind wide receiver Rondale Moore.

Prior to the start of his sophomore season, Parsons was named to the Butkus Award preseason watch list. He started 12 out of 13 games at middle linebacker, totaling 109 tackles (14 for loss), five sacks, 26 quarterback hurries, five deflected passes, and four forced fumbles. Parsons went on to be named the Butkus–Fitzgerald Linebacker of the Year (given to the Big Ten Linebacker of the Year) and a consensus All-American. Parsons was named the 2019 Cotton Bowl Classic defensive MVP after recording 14 tackles, two sacks, and two forced fumbles.

He opted out of the 2020 season due to concerns regarding the COVID-19 pandemic and declined his remaining years of college eligibility in favor of making himself available to the NFL in the 2021 draft. Despite leaving Penn State early to enter the NFL, Parsons completed his degree in criminology and graduated from Penn State in 2021.

College statistics

Professional career

2021
Parsons was selected in the first round (12th overall) by the Dallas Cowboys in the 2021 NFL Draft. He signed his four-year rookie contract, worth $17 million, on June 9, 2021. In response to DeMarcus Lawrence breaking his foot in practice, before week 2, Dallas converted Parsons back to his high school position of defensive end where he saw immediate success, particularly as a pass rusher. In Week 8, Parsons had 11 tackles, including four for loss in a 20–16 win over the Vikings, earning NFC Defensive Player of the Week. From Week 9 to Week 14, Parsons recorded at least 1 sack in six straight games. His 12 sacks in his first 13 career games are the fourth-most by a rookie in NFL history behind only Julius Peppers (13), Reggie White (13) and Leslie O'Neal (12.5). Parsons would finish with 84 total tackles, 13 sacks and three forced fumbles. He was voted into the Pro Bowl, named 1st Team All-Pro by the AP, and was the unanimous Defensive Rookie of the Year.

2022
In Week 5, Parsons had two sacks, five tackles, and a tackle for loss in a 22–10 win over the Rams, earning NFC Defensive Player of the Week.

He was named a 1st Team All-Pro by the AP at the end of the year.

NFL career statistics

Regular season

Postseason

Records and achievements

Cowboys franchise records
Rookie sack record: 13

Personal life 
Parsons is a native of Harrisburg, Pennsylvania. He is a fan of the Philadelphia Phillies and attended Game 3 of the 2022 World Series in Philadelphia.

In May 2018, Parsons became the father of a son, Malcolm. Parsons cited the risk that COVID-19 presented to the health and well-being of his son Malcolm as a major factor in his decision to opt out participation in the 2020 college football season. Parsons and his girlfriend had a daughter in January 14, 2023.

Parsons is a self-taught chess player, who uses the game to cultivate his game on the football field. He played in Chess.com's BlitzChamp tournament, a rapid tournament for NFL players.

On December 8, 2022, the United States announced a prisoner swap with Russia, which led to the release of WNBA basketball player, Brittney Griner from a Russian prison. In response, Parsons expressed disappointment that the US did not secure the release of Paul Whelan, a former U.S. Marine held in Russia, as part of the prisoner swap. On Twitter, Parsons wrote "Wait nah!! We left a marine?? Hell Nah." He later apologized for the comments.

References

External links
Penn State Nittany Lions bio

1999 births
Living people
American football linebackers
Penn State Nittany Lions football players
Players of American football from Harrisburg, Pennsylvania
All-American college football players
African-American players of American football
Dallas Cowboys players
21st-century African-American sportspeople
National Conference Pro Bowl players